Macrogomphus is a genus of dragonfly in the family Gomphidae. It contains the following species:
Macrogomphus abnormis Selys, 1884
Macrogomphus annulatus (Selys, 1854)
Macrogomphus borikhanensis Fraser, 1933
Macrogomphus decemlineatus Selys, 1878 
Macrogomphus guilinensis Chao, 1982 
Macrogomphus keiseri Lieftinck, 1955
Macrogomphus kerri Fraser, 1932
Macrogomphus lankanensis Fraser, 1933
Macrogomphus matsukii Asahina, 1986
Macrogomphus montanus Selys, 1869
Macrogomphus parallelogramma (Burmeister, 1839) 
Macrogomphus phalantus Lieftinck, 1935 
Macrogomphus quadratus Selys, 1878
Macrogomphus rivularis Förster, 1914
Macrogomphus robustus (Selys, 1878) 
Macrogomphus seductus Fraser, 1926 
Macrogomphus thoracicus McLachlan, 1884
Macrogomphus wynaadicus Fraser, 1924

References 

Gomphidae
Anisoptera genera
Taxonomy articles created by Polbot